Dale Barnard Waters (May 27, 1909 – December 19, 2001), nicknamed "Muddy" Waters, was an American college and professional football player who was an offensive and defensive lineman in the National Football League (NFL) for three seasons during the early 1930s.  Waters played college football for the University of Florida, and thereafter, he played for three different NFL teams.

Early years 

Waters was born in Henry County, Indiana in 1909.  He attended Newcastle High School in Newcastle Township, Fulton County, Indiana.

College career 

Waters attended the University of Florida in Gainesville, Florida, where he was an offensive and defensive lineman and varsity letterman for coach Charlie Bachman's Florida Gators football team in 1928, 1929 and 1930. When he first reported to the freshman team, he weighed just 165 pounds.

Waters was a member of the 1928 Gators team which led the nation in scoring and finished 8–1, losing only to the Tennessee Volunteers by a single point, 13–12.  Following his 1930 senior season, he received honorable mention All-American honors from the Associated Press.

He was also a guard for the Florida Gators basketball team, lettering in 1929, 1930 and 1931, and serving as the Gators' team captain as a senior in 1931. He was rated as one of the best guards in the south.

Waters graduated from the University of Florida with a bachelor's degree in physical education in 1935.

Professional career 

Waters became a professional football offensive lineman for the NFL's Cleveland Indians, Portsmouth Spartans, and the Boston Braves/Redskins (–).  During his three-season NFL career, Waters played in twenty-seven regular season NFL games, and started in twelve of them.

Coaching and administrative career 
Waters spent many years at Texas Western University (now the University of Texas at El Paso) as the men's basketball head coach and an assistant football coach, also earning a master's degree at the school. In 1957 he became El Paso's district athletic director.

See also 

 Florida Gators football, 1930–39
 List of Florida Gators in the NFL Draft
 List of University of Florida alumni
 List of Washington Redskins players

References

Bibliography 

 Carlson, Norm, University of Florida Football Vault: The History of the Florida Gators, Whitman Publishing, LLC, Atlanta, Georgia (2007).  .
 Golenbock, Peter, Go Gators!  An Oral History of Florida's Pursuit of Gridiron Glory, Legends Publishing, LLC, St. Petersburg, Florida (2002).  .
 Hairston, Jack, Tales from the Gator Swamp: A Collection of the Greatest Gator Stories Ever Told, Sports Publishing, LLC, Champaign, Illinois (2002).  .
 McCarthy, Kevin M.,  Fightin' Gators: A History of University of Florida Football, Arcadia Publishing, Mount Pleasant, South Carolina (2000).  .
 McEwen, Tom, The Gators: A Story of Florida Football, The Strode Publishers, Huntsville, Alabama (1974).  .
 Nash, Noel, ed., The Gainesville Sun Presents The Greatest Moments in Florida Gators Football, Sports Publishing, Inc., Champaign, Illinois (1998).  .

1909 births
2001 deaths
All-Southern college football players
American football offensive linemen
Basketball coaches from Indiana
Basketball players from Indiana
Cleveland Indians (NFL 1931) players
College men's basketball head coaches in the United States
Boston Braves (NFL) players
Boston Redskins players
Florida Gators football players
Florida Gators men's basketball players
People from Henry County, Indiana
Players of American football from Indiana
Portsmouth Spartans players
University of Texas at El Paso alumni
UTEP Miners football coaches
UTEP Miners men's basketball coaches
American men's basketball players
Guards (basketball)